Caminho Novo is a village in the north-eastern part of São Tomé Island in São Tomé and Príncipe. Its population is 1,256 (2012 census). It lies in the eastern part of the Mé-Zóchi District, adjacent to the town Bombom, 3.5 km south of the capital São Tomé.

Population history

References

Populated places in Mé-Zóchi District